Ariah Park News was a weekly English language newspaper published in Temora, New South Wales, Australia, between 1923 and approximately 1942.

Publication history 
The paper was first published on 5 April 1923 by Norman Scott. It was a weekly newspaper, circulated in "every Centre Between Temora and Ardlethan". It ceased publication in approximately 1942.

Digitisation 
The paper has been digitised as part of the Australian Newspapers Digitisation Program of the National Library of Australia.

See also 
 List of newspapers in New South Wales
 List of newspapers in Australia

References

External links 

Defunct weekly newspapers
Defunct newspapers published in New South Wales
Newspapers on Trove